Chinese Taipei competed in the 2016 Asian Beach Games in Danang, Vietnam from September 24 to October 5, 2016. The delegation was bannered by 53 athletes in 10 sports including 3x3 basketball, beach handball, beach kurash, beach volleyball, beach woodball, beach wrestling, ju-jitsu, muay thai, pétanque, and vovinam.

Lee Wan-ting, gold medallist in 2014, won the gold medal again in the women’s -57 kg division contest for beach kurash. Hsiao Chia-hung and Wang Wan-yi won the Men's Doubles Fairway for beach woodball. Chang Hui-tsz won the sivel medal in the women's +70 kg division for beach wrestling.

Competitors

Medal summary

Medal by Sport

References 

Nations at the 2016 Asian Beach Games
Chinese Taipei at the Asian Beach Games
2016 in Taiwanese sport